Ulrika Karlsson may refer to:

 Ulrika Karlsson (footballer)
 Ulrika Karlsson (politician)